Adhunagar Union
 is a union of Lohagara Upazila, Chittagong District, Bangladesh. It is a union of Lohagara upazila of Chittagong district, surrounded by rivers, hills, green ornaments and natural reservoirs. The Dolu River, Uzir Deba  and the nearby Kazir Deba  and the adjacent Rafiya Mura, both sides of the Cox's Bazar highway, are very interesting.

In spite of being near Rafiya Mura habitat, there are porcupine, foxes, rabbit, monkeys, wild cat and moorfowl/wild cock and occasionally the deer's free behavior is seen.
Any kind of hunting is here totally forbidden.

History 
This area was named Adunagar , under the name of Mughal Subadar Adu Khan,  Later known as Adhunagar

Geography 

The location of the Adhunogor Union in the western part of Lohagara Upazila. The distance of the union from Lohagara upazila headquarters is about 2 kilometers. Chunati Union  on the south of the union; Putibila Union and Lohagara Union before; Amirabad Union on the north, Sonakania Union of Satkania Upazila and Barhatia Union of Lohagara Upazila and Chambal Union of Banskhali Upazila on the west. Note that the hills and Tila with red soil of Chittagong-Cox's Bazar highway are visible from the Hazir rastar matha (A road circle name)  in this area...

Dolu River and Tonkaboti River is passing over the Mid-Union. It also flows through the river Adhunagar, and the Adhunagar Kulpagali canal, Hangor Canal and Hatia Canal also ..

Population 
According to the 2011 figures, 20,575 people of the Union Parishad Union. Males constitute 10,143 and females 10,432.

Economy 
Until 1991, the vast majority of people in this area were dependent on agriculture. This area is now known as the businessman and Saudi Arab expatriate area. Currently the main source of income in this region is foreign currency. This area is suitable for fish farming because of this many fisheries farms have been developed.

Agriculture
All fertile crops are cultivated due to the fertile soil being close to the higher land and hills... .

Besides the major crops, rice is famous for its use of sugarcane, watermelon, fennel pulses and chilli. Winter varieties of vegetables are cultivated here in the winter season.

Village market 
The main hats / markets of the Adhunagar Union are the Adhunagar Khan Hat Market and the Adhunagar Hatiar Kul Market..
Also in the month of Baishakh a village fair called 'Surjykola' has existed for more than hundred years.

Points of interest
 Ujir Deba (Lake) 
 Kazir Deba (Lake)

  
 Rafiya Mura (Raiksha Mura)

Religious place of worship 
There are 49 mosques, 3 temples and 3 Buddhist monasteries in the Adhunagar Union.

Administration
The Adhunagar Union Parishad No 9 under the control of Lohagara Upazila. The administrative activities of the union are under the control of Lohagara Police Station. This section of the constituency Chittagong-15 of 292 constituencies of the Union Jatiya Sangsad  (National Parliament of Bangladesh).. 
This Union divided into 3 Mouzas and 9 Ward ...

The villages of the ward-based union are:

Local government
 Current Chairman: Alhaj Mohammad Nazim Uddin

List of Chairmen

Communication system 
The main road of communication between Adhunagar Union is Chittagong-Cox's Bazar Highway. All types of vehicles can be contacted.

Education 
The literacy rate of the Adhunagar Union is 47.73%. There  are 1 Fazil Madrasa, 3 Secondary Schools, 1 Dakhil Madrasa, 1 Quami Madrasa, 1 Lower Secondary School, 9 Primary Schools and 4 Ebtedayi Madrasa in the Union.

Madrasa

 Adhunagar Islamia Fazil Madrasa
 Adhunagar Akhtaria Dakhil Madrasa
 Adhunagar Hafezia Sharifia Latifia Madrasa & Yatimkhana 

Secondary school

 Adhunagar High School
 Adhunagar Gul-A-Zar Girls High School
 Rashider Ghona High School

Lower secondary school

 Hazi Mostaq Ahmad Chy High School

Primary school

 Adhunagar Damir Pukur Par Govt Primary School
 Adhunagar Govt Primary School
 Uttar  Adhunagar  Govt Primary School
 Uttar Horina Govt Primary School
 Dakshin  Adhunagar Govt Primary School
 Dakshin Horina Govt Primary School
 Masdia Govt Primary School
 Rashider Ghona  Govt Primary School
 Hazi Shamsul Islam Govt Primary School

Ebtedayi madrasa

 Dakshin Horina Darul Falah Shah Rashidia Ebtedayi Madrasa
 Rashider Ghona Shah Hafezia Rahmania Ebtedayi Madrasa 
 Satgarh Shah Ataullah Ebtedayi Madrasa 
 Hazrat Abu Huayra (R) Ebetedayi Madrasa

See also 
 Chunati Union
 Lohagara Upazila, Chittagong
 Chittagong District

References

Unions of Lohagara Upazila, Chittagong